Abolfazl Alaei is an Iranian football midfielder who currently plays for Iranian football club Pars Jonoubi in the Persian Gulf Pro League.

References

1994 births
Living people
Iranian footballers
People from Golpayegan
Association football midfielders
Foolad Yazd players
Esteghlal Khuzestan F.C. players
Nassaji Mazandaran players